The Audition is a 2015 short film directed by Martin Scorsese. It stars Robert De Niro and Leonardo DiCaprio, playing fictionalized versions of themselves, who travel through Asia and compete against each other for a potential role in Scorsese's next film.

The short film was created as a promotional piece for the Studio City Macau Resort and Casino. It is Scorsese's first film to feature both De Niro and DiCaprio. While both actors had individually worked with Scorsese several times in the past (De Niro with eight films when the short was released, DiCaprio with five), and De Niro and DiCaprio had appeared together in two films (for the films This Boy's Life and Marvin's Room), the three had never collaborated on a project together. The three are slated to collaborate again on their first full-length feature film together for Killers of the Flower Moon. Brad Pitt, also playing a fictionalized version of himself, makes a cameo appearance.

Plot
Robert De Niro and Leonardo DiCaprio meet with Martin Scorsese at the City of Dreams Resort in Manila to audition for his newest film. Despite their long histories of working with Scorsese, the two actors learn they are competing against one another for the same role.

Scorsese explains the potential role to his two longtime collaborators as they continue to Studio City in Macau. As De Niro and DiCaprio listen, both exhaust Scorsese with their personal cases as to why they are right for the part. While the three have dinner in the hotel, Scorsese becomes inspired when he sees a billboard featuring Brad Pitt.

The three then make their way towards Japan. Scorsese announces that neither are right for the role, and quickly parts ways with the two. As De Niro and DiCaprio wonder why they were not selected, they catch Scorsese meeting with Pitt, who had arrived in Japan on short notice. Pitt delivers a few line readings, but Scorsese looks unimpressed.

De Niro and DiCaprio realize that Pitt was chosen for the role, and the two walk off in disappointment. With the audition over, the two decide to enjoy their evening in Japan with one another.

Cast
Robert De Niro as himself
Leonardo DiCaprio as himself
Brad Pitt as himself / Jake Ryan
Martin Scorsese as himself
Rodrigo Prieto as himself

Production
The Audition was financed by the Melco Crown Entertainment Limited to commission the opening of its Studio City Macau Resort and Casino. As advertisements for casinos are banned in mainland China, speculation arose that Melco used the short to exploit a loophole to promote the casino. With the short film's budget around $70 million, each actor was reportedly paid $13 million for less than two days' work.

The script was written by Terence Winter, with whom Scorsese had previously collaborated on The Wolf of Wall Street and Boardwalk Empire. Scorsese described the writing process for a short as being "tougher in a way" than for a feature film, as a short had to be self-contained rather than preluding to a larger work. He also said his aim for the script was to create a heightened sense of reality-based humor based on the actors in the film. Shooting lasted for less than one week and was done in New York City. The casino was not built during the short film's production, so 3D renderings had to be done in order to recreate the location during filming.

De Niro, DiCaprio and Scorsese relished the opportunity to collaborate on the project. Scorsese acknowledged the strong bond between the three of them, as he first learned of DiCaprio through De Niro. DiCaprio said the short film's premise felt humorous for himself and De Niro due to their long histories of working with Scorsese. He took great joy in finally being on set with both De Niro and Scorsese; he described the years of collaboration between the two as "the greatest relationship in cinema history".

Release
On October 27, 2015, The Audition made its official world premiere at the Studio City casino and resort in Macau, China in conjunction with the resort's grand opening. Scorsese, De Niro, DiCaprio and producer Brett Ratner were each in attendance for the premiere.

A prior screening had taken place earlier that month at the 20th Busan International Film Festival in South Korea on October 3, 2015. The short was also supposed to screen at the Venice Film Festival on September 7, 2015 but was reportedly cancelled due to technical problems. Rumors also floated that the reason behind the cancellation was due to some perceiving the film as a promotional piece rather than one of artistic merit.

The Audition has never had a commercial release to date. However it was placed as an advertisement before feature film screenings in cinemas across Hong Kong and China in order to further promote Studio City.

Critical reception
Elizabeth Kerr of The Hollywood Reporter called The Audition a "keenly self-aware pop culture nugget" that blurred the line between art and advertising. She noted that the short's contents thrived off this tension, saying "The Audition works on the strength of its (surprise!) strong cast and an awareness that they’re all shilling for a casino chain. But Scorsese and his A-list cast pull it off with aplomb, having a good time at their own expense".

References

External links
 

2015 films
2015 comedy films
2015 short films
2010s English-language films
American short films
Short films directed by Martin Scorsese
Unreleased American films